John J. Thomas (August 8, 1813 – 1895) was a prominent Confederate politician. He was born in Albemarle County, Virginia and later moved to Kentucky, where he served in the state legislature in 1851. He represented the state in the Provisional Confederate Congress from 1861 to 1862 and afterwards served in the Confederate Army.

External links
Index to Politicians: Thomas, J. at The Political Graveyard

1813 births
1895 deaths
Deputies and delegates to the Provisional Congress of the Confederate States
Members of the Kentucky House of Representatives